Saranya Ponvannan (born Sheela Christina) is an Indian actress who predominantly appears in Tamil, Telugu, and Malayalam language films. Saranya made her debut in a lead role in Mani Ratnam's Nayakan (1987) and went on to play lead roles from 1987 to 1996. Following an eight-year sabbatical, she returned to films in 2003 as a character actor roles.

Career

Saranya made her Tamil debut in Mani Ratnam's production Nayakan, as the female lead opposite Kamal Haasan in 1987. She made her first Telugu appearance in 1989 film Neerajanam; her Malayalam debut was in the same year with the film Artham starring opposite Mammootty. In 1996 almost during the end of her career as a lead actress she debuted in Kannada cinema in Appaji.

After marriage in 1995, she quit from acting. However,in 1996 she acted with Ananthnag movie SAMAYAKKONDU SULLU in 2000 she appeared playing the lead role in the comedy television series, Veettukku Veedu Lootty, and subsequently accepted some supporting roles in other projects. During 2006 she appeared in family-drama serial Mugangal, which aired on Sun TV.

After a break from films she made a comeback in 2003 Tamil film Alai opposite  Raghuvaran as Silambarasan 's mother. Since then she has been noted for her "mother" roles in films most notably Raam, Thavamai Thavamirundhu and Em Magan in the mid-2000s.

Her performance as Veerayi, a widowed mother torn between love and possessiveness, in the 2010 film Thenmerku Paruvakaatru –  her 100th release – earned her the National Film Award for Best Actress. Her major breakthrough was 2005 Tamil film Thavamai Thavamirundhu after which she established herself as a prominent and leading actress in South India. As of 2017, she was one of the highest paid character actresses in the south Indian film industry.

In 2014, she launched Design & School of Fashion Technology (DSOFT), a fashion institute at Virugamakkam, Chennai.

She has also played the role of villain in Achamindri (2016).

In 2017, she had only three releases. She starred in the sequel of 2014 Tamil film Velaiyilla Pattathari, reprising the role of Bhuvana, in a cameo appearance. The character had died in the original film, but the filmmakers wanted her to appear in the sequel, because of her part in the former's success.
Her second venture was with Vishnu Vishal in the film Katha Nayagan, playing the mother of Vishnu Vishal.
Later she starred in Magalir Mattum, a women-centric film, in which she played alongside Jyothika, Oorvasi and Bhanupriya.

In 2018, she was first seen in comedy-family drama Mannar Vagaiyara as Vemal's mother; her comedy timing was well received, however Itly was released and opened to negative reviews.
Later she was seen in Vijay Sethupathi's Junga and Nayanthara's Kolamavu Kokila as the mother of Kokila who although affected by lung cancer, assists her daughter in smuggling cocaine.

She took on the role of Vishalavva, mother to Shiva Rajkumar's character in Kannada movie The Villain directed by Prem in 2018. Later she was seen in Madhupal's Malayalam thriller drama Oru Kuprasidha Payyan playing Chembammal.

She signed to reprise the role of Lakshmi in Kalavani 2. Her first Telugu release of the year was Gang Leader where she played the lead role Varalakshmi alongside Nani, Lakshmi, Kartikeya Gummakonda, Priyanka Arul Mohan among others.

After a brief hiatus because of COVID-19 Pandemic, her first release was through OTT in 2021 was Bhoomi alongside Jayam Ravi. Critics cited that the talented actress was restricted to few insignificant scenes. Following Bhoomi, she had two other releases in 2021 - multistarer Telugu film Maha Samudharam and Sasikumar's MGR Magan.

Personal life
She was born in a Christian family at Alappuzha, Kerala and is the daughter of Malayalam film director A. B. Raj who directed over 75 films.
Saranya married actor-director Ponvannan in 1995 and the couple has two daughters.

Awards
National Film Awards
 2011—Best Actress for Thenmerku Paruvakaatru

Tamil Nadu State Film Awards
 2006 – Best Supporting Actress for Em Magan
 2010 – Best Supporting Actress for Kalavani

Filmfare Awards
Winnings:
 2005 – Winner—Best Supporting Actress for Thavamai Thavamirundhu
 2006 – Winner—Best Supporting Actress for Em Magan
 2011 – Winner—Best Supporting Actress for Thenmerku Paruvakaatru
 2012 – Winner—Best Supporting Actress for Neerparavai 
 2019 - Winner- Best Supporting Actress for Kolamavu Kokila
Nominations:
 2005 - Nominated- Best Supporting Actress - Tamil for Raam
 2012 - Nominated- Best Supporting Actress - Tamil for Oru Kal Oru Kannadi
2010 – Nominated—Filmfare Award for Best Supporting Actress - Telugu for Puli
2014 – Nominated–Best Supporting Actress - Tamil for Velaiyilla Pattathari
2016 – Nominated–Best Supporting Actress - Tamil for Kodi

South Indian International Movie Awards 
 2013 – Winner—Best Actress in a Supporting Role for Neerparavai
 2014 – Nominated–Best Actress in a Supporting Role for Kutti Puli
 2015 – Winner—Best Actress in a Supporting Role for Velaiyilla Pattathari
 2019 – Nominated–Best Actress in a Supporting Role for Kolamavu Kokila

Ananda Vikatan Awards
2010 – Winner–Best Supporting Actress for Kalavani
2014 – Winner–Best Supporting Actress for Ennamo Nadakkudhu & Velaiyilla Pattathari

Vijay Awards
 2011 – Winner—Best Supporting Actress for Thenmerku Paruvakaatru
2013 - Nominated—Best Supporting Actress for Oru Kal Oru Kannadi
2015 – Nominated–Best Supporting Actress for Velaiyilla Pattathari

Norway Tamil Film Festival Awards
2011 - Winner-Best Supporting Actress for Thenmerku Paruvakaatru
2013 - Winner-Best Supporting Actress for Oru Kal Oru Kannadi
2014 - Nominated-Best Supporting Actress forVelaiyilla Pattathari

Edison Awards
2011 - Winner-Best Supporting Actress for Thenmerku Paruvakaatru

JFW Awards
2014 - Women Achiever of the year

JFW Movie Awards
2019 - Best Supporting Actress for Kolamavu Kokila

Filmography

Film

As playback singer

Television

References

External links
 

20th-century Indian actresses
Actresses in Tamil cinema
Actresses from Alappuzha
Actresses in Malayalam cinema
Indian film actresses
Living people
Best Actress National Film Award winners
Filmfare Awards South winners
Tamil Nadu State Film Awards winners
Women's Christian College, Chennai alumni
Actresses in Telugu cinema
Actresses in Kannada cinema
Actresses in Tamil television
Year of birth missing (living people)